Light is an electromagnetic radiation, part of which stimulates the sense of vision.

Light or Lights may also refer to:

Illumination
 Light bulb
 Traffic light

Arts and entertainment

Music
 Lights (musician) (born 1987), Canadian singer-songwriter
 Light Records, a record label

Albums
 Light (Matisyahu album), 2009
 Light (Xu Weizhou album), 2016
 Light, a 2004 album by Jeff Deyo
 Light, a 2010 album by DakhaBrakha

 Lights (EP), a 2008 EP by Lights
 Lights (Archive album), 2006
 Lights (Brigade album), 2006
 Lights (Ellie Goulding album), 2010
 Lights, a 2013 EP by Kitchen Party

Songs
 "Spotlight" (Xiao Zhan song), also known as "Light" (2020)
 "Lights" (BTS song) (2019)
 "Lights" (Ellie Goulding song) (2010)
 "Lights" (Journey song), by Journey from album Infinity
 "Light" (KMFDM song) (1993)
 "Light" (Music for Pleasure song) (1982)
 "Light" (San Holo song) (2016)
 "Lights" (Styx Song) (1980)
 "Light", a song by Big Sean, featuring Jeremih, from I Decided
 "Light", a song by Camouflage from Relocated
 "Light", a song by Depeche Mode from the deluxe box set edition of Sounds of the Universe
 "Lights", a song by Editors from The Back Room
 "Lights", a 2017 song by Inna from Nirvana
 "Lights", a song by Interpol from their eponymous album
 "Light (Pop's Principle)", a song by Laura Nyro fromNested
 "Light", a song by Odesza featuring Little Dragon from the deluxe edition of In Return
 "Lights", a song by Scissor Sisters from Ta-Dah
 "Light", a song from Next to Normal

Fictional characters
 Light (Doctor Who), a villain from Doctor Who
 Doctor Light (disambiguation), several fictional characters
 Light Yagami, a character from the anime and manga series Death Note
 Light (Twinbee), a character from the Twinbee franchise

Other arts and entertainment
 Light (journal), a journal of light verse
 Light (novel), a 2002 science fiction novel by M. John Harrison
 "Light", an episode of Legend of the Seeker, an American television series
 "Light", an episode of the Adult Swim television series Off the Air
 Light, a 2019 play based on the lives of William Light and his father

Companies
 Light S.A., a Brazilian electricity distribution and retailing company
 Light (company), a digital photography peripheral company

Places
 County of Light, a cadastral county in South Australia 
 Electoral district of Light
 Light Regional Council, a local government in South Australia
 Light River (South Australia)
 Light River (New Zealand)
 Light, Arkansas, an unincorporated community in the United States
 Light, Missouri, an unincorporated community in the United States

Other uses
 Light (surname)
 Light (automobile), a car built in 1914 in Detroit
 Lights (offal), the lungs of an animal used in cooking
 Light (web browser), a lightweight web browser based on Firefox
 Light (window), the area between the outer parts of a window (head, sill and jambs), the mullions and transoms
 Skyway Light, a German paramotor design
 Ventilated cigarettes or lights, a cigarette type with a low level of nicotine
 World of Light, transcendental realm in Mandaeism
 LIGHT, the Leeds Institute of Genetics, Health and Therapeutics at Leeds School of Medicine

See also
 Atmospheric ghost lights
 The Light (disambiguation)
 Light Square, in Adelaide
 Licht (disambiguation)
 Lite (disambiguation)
 Lyte (disambiguation)
 An-Nur ("Light" or "The Light"), a sura of the Qur'an
 Pragaash (translation: "Light"), an all-girl Kashmiri rock band